In the run-up to the 1979 general election, various organisations carried out opinion polling to gauge voting intention. Results of such polls are displayed in this article. The date range for these opinion polls are from the October general election until 3 May 1979.

Graphical summaries 
The chart below depicts opinion polls conducted for the 1979 United Kingdom general election using a 15-poll moving average.

National Poll Results
All data is from UK Polling Report.

1979

1978

1977

1976

1975

1974

References

Opinion polling for United Kingdom general elections
1979 United Kingdom general election